Church is an electoral ward of the Borough of Reading, in the English county of Berkshire. It is covers an area south and south-east of the town centre, and is bordered by Katesgrove, Park, Redlands and Whitley wards.

As with all wards, apart from smaller Mapledurham, it elects three councillors to Reading Borough Council.  Elections since 2004 are held by thirds, with elections in three years out of four.

In the 2011, 2012 and 2014 a Labour Party candidate won each election.

These Councillors are currently, in order of election: Paul Woodward, Eileen McElligott and Ashley Pearce.

References

Wards of Reading